Ann Sophia Stephens (March 10, 1810–August 20, 1886) was an American novelist and magazine editor. She was the author of dime novels and is credited as the progenitor of that genre.

Early life 
Ann Sophia Stephens was born on March 30, 1810, in Derby, Connecticut; she was the daughter of Ann and John Winterbotham, son of William Winterbotham. He was the manager of a woolen mill owned by Col. David Humphreys. Her mother died early and she was brought up by her mother's sister, who eventually became her stepmother. She was educated at a dame school in South Britain, Connecticut, and started writing at an early age. She married Edward Stephens, a printer from Plymouth, Massachusetts, in 1831 and they relocated to Portland, Maine. The actress Clara Bloodgood was the daughter of their son, Edward Stephens, a well known New York lawyer.

Career 

While in Portland, she and her husband co-founded, published and edited the Portland Magazine, a monthly literary periodical where some of her early work first appeared. The magazine was sold in 1837. They moved to New York where Ann took the job of editor to The Ladies Companion and where she could further her literary work. This was also the time she adopted the humorous pseudonym Jonathan Slick.  Over the next few years she wrote over twenty-five serial novels plus short stories and poems for several well known periodicals which included Godey's Lady's Book and Graham's Magazine. Her first novel Fashion and Famine was published in 1854. She started her own magazine Mrs Stephens' Illustrated New Monthly in 1856, it was published by her husband. The magazine merged with Peterson's Magazine a few years later.

The term "dime novel" originated with Stephens's Malaeska, the Indian Wife of the White Hunter, printed in the first book in Beadle & Adams's Beadle’s Dime Novels series, dated June 9, 1860. The novel was a reprint of Stephens's earlier serial that appeared in the Ladies' Companion magazine in February, March, and April 1839. Later, the Grolier Club listed Malaeska as the most influential book of 1860. Some of her other work includes High Life in New York (1843), Alice Copley: A Tale of Queen Mary's Time (1844), The Diamond Necklace and Other Tale (1846),  The Old Homestead (1855), The Rejected Wife (1863) and A Noble Woman (1871).

Works
Alice Copley: A Tale of Queen Mary's Time
A Noble Woman
Bellehood and Bondage
Bertha's Engagement
The Curse of Gold
The Diamond Necklace and Other Tale
Doubly False
Fashion and Famine
The Gold Brick
The Heiress
High Life in New York
Katharine Allen; or, The Gold Brick
Lord Hope's Choice
Mabel's Mistake
Malaeska, the Indian Wife of the White Hunter
Married in Haste
Mary Derwent
The Old Countess
The Old Homestead
Palaces and Prisons
The Reigning Belle
The Rejected Wife
Ruby Gray's Strategy
Silent Struggles
The Soldiers' Orphans
The Wife's Secret
Wives and Widows
The Lady Mary

References

External links

Works by Ann S. Stephens at Nickels and Dimes from Northern Illinois University
 
 
 

1810 births
1886 deaths
19th-century American novelists
American women novelists
Novelists from Connecticut
19th-century American women writers
Dime novelists
People from Derby, Connecticut